The North Pacific albatrosses are large seabirds from the genus Phoebastria in the albatross family. They are the most tropical of the albatrosses, with two species (the Laysan and black-footed albatrosses) nesting in the Northwestern Hawaiian Islands, one on sub-tropical islands south of Japan (the short-tailed albatross), and one nesting on the equator (the waved albatross).

Taxonomy
Their taxonomy is very confusing, as with all albatrosses. It is widely accepted now, based on molecular evidence and the fossil record, that they are a distinct genus from Diomedea in which formerly most "white" albatrosses were placed but which is now restricted to the "great" albatrosses. They share certain identifying features. First, they have nasal passages that attach to the upper bill called naricorns. Although the nostrils on the albatross are on the sides of the bill. The bills of Procellariiformes are also unique in that they are split into between seven and nine horny plates. Finally, they produce a stomach oil made up of wax esters and triglycerides that is stored in the proventriculus. This is used against predators as well as an energy rich food source for chicks and for the adults during their long flights. They also have a salt gland that is situated above the nasal passage and that helps desalinate their bodies, to compensate for the high amount of ocean water that they imbibe. It excretes a high saline solution from their nose.

Species
Genus Phoebastria – North Pacific albatrosses

This genus and Diomedea had already diverged in the Middle Miocene (12–15 mya). Several fossil forms are known, which incidentally prove that Phoebastria was formerly distributed in the North Atlantic also. The current distribution is thus a relict. The oldest known species, P. californica, was at least the size of the short-tailed albatross and may have been an ancestor of that bird.

Fossil species
 Phoebastria californica (Temblor Middle Miocene of Sharktooth Hill, US)
 Phoebastria anglica (Middle Pliocene – Early Pleistocene of NC Atlantic coasts)
 Phoebastria cf. albatrus (San Diego Late Pliocene of San Diego County, US) – formerly Diomedea howardae
 Phoebastria rexsularum
 Phoebastria cf. immutabilis (San Pedro Pleistocene of San Pedro, US)
 Phoebastria cf. nigripes (San Pedro Pleistocene of San Pedro, US)

Description

Behavior
The feeding habits of these albatrosses are similar to other albatrosses in that they eat fish, squid, crustacea, and carrion.

Observations made during June 2010 from the Hokkaido University research vessel the Oshoro Maru in the western North Pacific showed an apparent symbiotic relationship between a school of 57 ocean sunfish (Mola mola) and Laysan and black-footed albatrosses.  The sunfish were infected with the mesoparasitic copepods from the genus Pennella and the albatrosses were seen to remove these parasites from the sunfish which appeared to be actively attempting to attract the albatrosses.

When roosting, they choose isolated sites and lay one egg, with both parents incubating and raising the chick. They are monogamous species, and they don't start breeding until they are 5–15 years old.

See also
 List of albatross breeding locations

References

Further reading
 
 
Tickell, W. L. N. (2000): Albatrosses. Pica Press, Sussex. 

Phoebastria
Taxa named by Ludwig Reichenbach
Taxa described in 1853